Dibdibo is a reservoir named after the homonymous village, located in the Inticho woreda of the Tigray Region in Ethiopia. The earthen dam that holds the reservoir was built in 1999 by the Relief Society of Tigray.

Dam characteristics 
 Dam height: 17.8 metres
 Dam crest length: 433 metres
 Spillway width: 15 metres

Capacity 
 Original capacity: 1 022 900 m³
 Dead storage: 153 435 m³
 Reservoir area: 17.24 ha
In 2002, the life expectancy of the reservoir (the duration before it is filled with sediment) was estimated at 22 years.

Irrigation 
 Designed irrigated area: 100 ha
 Actual irrigated area in 2002: 70 ha

Environment 
The catchment of the reservoir is 7 km² large. The reservoir suffers from rapid siltation. The lithology of the catchment is Adigrat Sandstone, Enticho Sandstone, tertiary basalt and Precambrian metavolcanics. Part of the water that could be used for irrigation is lost through seepage; the positive side-effect is that this contributes to groundwater recharge.

References 

Reservoirs in Ethiopia
1999 establishments in Ethiopia
Tigray Region